Sport in Denmark is diverse. The national sport is football with the most notable results being qualifying for the European Championships six times in a row (1984–2004) and winning the Championship in 1992. Other significant achievements include winning the Confederations Cup in 1995 and reaching the quarter final of the 1998 World Cup. Other popular sports include handball, esports, cycling, sailing sports, badminton, ice hockey, swimming, and recently also golf. A few youths also play basketball.

Sport is encouraged in school, and there are local sports clubs in all cities and most towns.

The national stadium for football is the Parken Stadium.

Football

Football is the most popular sport in Denmark, with over 313,000 players in more than 1600 clubs. The national football team in Denmark have reached high and notable results, like qualifying for the European Championships six times in a row (1984–2004) and winning the UEFA Championship in 1992. Other significant achievements include winning the Confederations Cup in 1995 and reaching the quarter final of the 1998 World Cup.

Denmark national football team reached #3 ranking in the FIFA ranking in May 1997, and #1 at the World Football Elo Ratings system in (1912–1920).

The top-league in Danish football is called The Danish Superliga. The reigning champions are F.C. Copenhagen, while they are also the most successful club ever in financial terms. Famous Superliga players include Per Nielsen, Jimmy Nielsen, Michael Hansen, Mogens Krogh, Daniel Agger and Jesper Grønkjær.

The second level league is the Danish 1st Division, which was last won by Lyngby Boldklub. The third tier is made up of the two Danish 2nd Divisions: East and West. The last two champions were NordVest (East) and Blokhus FC (West). The fourth tier is the Denmark Series, which is split into three pools. The last champions were BK Marienlyst, IF Skjold Birkerød and Kjellerup IF.

The top women's league is the Elitedivisionen, most recently won by Fortuna Hjørring. HEI Aarhus are the most successful team, with 10 titles.

The premier cup competition is the Danish Cup, won in 2016 by F.C. Copenhagen. AGF are 9 time champions. Copenhagen are also the last winners of the Danish Supercup, back in 2004, of which Brøndby IF are the most successful club. Brøndby are the only winners of the twice-held Danish League Cup.

The Danish Women's Cup has been won the last three times in a row by Brøndby IF, and seven times overall by Fortuna Hjørring.

The current manager of the national team is Kasper Hjulmand, and Simon Kjær is the captain. Legendary former players include Poul "Tist" Nielsen, Peter Schmeichel, Jon Dahl Tomasson, Allan Simonsen and Michael Laudrup.

Handball

Denmark has a long history with handball, with the sport originating in Denmark. Handball is one of the most popular pastimes in Denmark, only exceeded by football. There are over 146,000 licensed handball players in Denmark. Both the male and female national teams have reached high international rankings.

Denmark women's national handball team have won the Olympics gold medal a record three times, the European Women's Handball Championship three times, and the World Women's Handball Championship once. The male national team won the European Men's Handball Championship in 2008 and 2012, won gold at the Olympics in 2016 and has become world champions three times in a row, in 2019, 2021 and 2023, which is a feat no other country has managed. Denmark co-hosted the 2019 tournament with Germany, and will do so again in 2025, this time with Croatia and Norway.

Motorcycle speedway
Denmark have marked their status as one of the leading motorcycle speedway countries. Denmark has won the Speedway World Cup four times in 2006, 2008, 2012 and 2014 and came second in 2007 missing only two points to Poland.

Danish Speedway World Championship Champions include Ole Olsen, Erik Gundersen, Hans Nielsen (nicknamed "The Professor", four-times World Champion), and Nicki Pedersen, the 2003, 2007, and 2008 World Champion.

Erik Gundersen and Hans Nielsen occupied the first two places at Gothenburg in 1984. In fact, there were two Danes on top of the table in each and every World final from 1984 to 1988 - a somewhat extraordinary record. Gundersen and Nielsen took three titles each as the Danes won six successive and seven out of eight titles from 1984 to 1991.

Ice hockey

There are seven Danish ice hockey players currently in the National Hockey League (NHL): Lars Eller of the Washington Capitals, Frederik Andersen of the Carolina Hurricanes, Nikolaj Ehlers of the Winnipeg Jets, Alexander True of the Seattle Kraken, Oliver Bjorkstrand of the Seattle Kraken, Mads Søgaard of the Ottawa Senators and Jonas Røndbjerg of the Vegas Golden Knights. Other Danes who have played in the NHL include Frans Nielsen, Jannik Hansen, Peter Regin, Philip Larsen and Oliver Lauridsen. The first Dane to play a game in the NHL was Frans Nielsen on January 6, 2006. Lars Eller became  the first Dane to win the Stanley Cup with Washington Capitals in 2018. There also many Danes in top level leagues like KHL and Swedish Hockey League.

The Denmark men's national ice hockey team have been in the best division since 2003. The Danish national hockey team scored two historic, unexpected upsets in Tampere, Finland, defeating the United States 5-2 on April 26, 2003 and tied Canada 2-2 six days later on May 2, 2003. At the 2010 World Championship Denmark finished eighth place, which is their best placing to date. The Denmark men's national ice hockey team and the Denmark women's national ice hockey team are both currently number 10 on the IIHF World Ranking. In 2018 Denmark was the host of the 2018 IIHF World Championships, Herning and Copenhagen were the host cities.

Badminton
Denmark is Europe's strongest badminton country. Danish players have won 11 gold medals at the World Championships since 1977, 63 gold medals at the European Badminton Championships since 1968, and 19 titles at the Europe Cup since 1978. The Denmark national badminton team has won the 2016 Thomas Cup, and has been runner-up eight times in the Thomas Cup, three times in the Uber Cup, and two times in the Sudirman Cup. At the 

In men's badminton, Poul-Erik Høyer Larsen's victory at the 1996 Olympic Games is one of two gold medals for Europe. Erland Kops won seven All England Open Badminton Championships in singles and four All England titles in doubles from the late 1950s to the late 1960s, whilst Morten Frost was one of the top players of the 1980s, winning the 1984 World Badminton Grand Prix and four All England singles titles. Topped the world rankings from 1998 to 2001 and with 22 Grand-Prix titles, Peter Gade is one of the world's most successful badminton players. Viktor Axelsen is the 2017 and 2022 world champion as well as the 2020 Olympic champion.

In women's badminton, Kirsten Thorndahl and Tonny Ahm claimed singles, women's doubles and mixed doubles titles at the All England. Lene Køppen and Camilla Martin have won singles titles at the World Championships and All-England. Other notable women's players include Ulla Strand (All-England doubles titles), Rikke Olsen (six World Championship medals), Helene Kirkegaard (two medals at the World Championships), Tine Baun (All-England singles titles), Kamilla Rytter Juhl (World mixed doubles title), and Christinna Pedersen (two Olympic and five World Championship medals).

The premier international badminton tournament in Denmark is the Denmark Open, which is part of the BWF World Tour. Meanwhile, the Danish National Badminton Championships is the most prestigious tournament for Danish players, and the Danish Badminton League is the main tournament for Danish clubs.

Cycling

Historically, Denmark's most successful name in cycling has been Thorvald Ellegaard won the world professional sprint title in six times, three European titles, and 24 Danish titles.

In recent years, Denmark has made a mark as a strong cycling nation, with Bjarne Riis winning Tour de France in 1996, and Michael Rasmussen reaching King of the Mountains status, in the Tour 2005 and 2006. Other well-known Danish riders are Matti Breschel, Nicki Sørensen, Bo Hamburger, Jesper Skibby, Jakob Fuglsang and Lars Michaelsen. Two Danish riders have won monuments, the five most prestigious one-day classics: Rolf Sørensen, who won Liège–Bastogne–Liège in 1993 and the Tour of Flanders in 1997, and Fuglsang, who won the 2019 edition of Liège–Bastogne–Liège.  Team Saxo Bank has been the most successful cycling team in Denmark: the team was founded in 1998 as Team Home-Jack and Jones and led by Bjarne Riis from the following year. It competed as a Danish-registered team until 2014, when it switched its registration to Russia after being sold to Russian businessman Oleg Tinkov, although Riis stayed as the team's manager until 2015. In 2008 Carlos Sastre won the Tour de France while riding for Saxo Bank, one of five Grand Tour wins the team took in an eight year span. They also enjoyed success in the monuments, with Fabian Cancellara (who won Milan–San Remo in 2008 and the Tour of Flanders in 2010), Andy Schleck (who won Liège–Bastogne–Liège in 2009) and Nick Nuyens (who won the Tour of Flanders in 2011). In addition Cancellara won two World Road Time Trial Championship titles whilst riding for the team.

In the past years, the Danish cycling has suffered from dope-cases. Bjarne Riis, Bo Hamburger, Rolf Sørensen, Jesper Skibby, Michael Rasmussen all confessed doping use, or were related with doping. But despite all the bad publicity, cycling is still quite a popular sport in Denmark. In 2011, Copenhagen hosted the UCI world championships on the road.

Golf
Golf has become a highly popular sport in recent years in Denmark with more than 180 courses across the country.

Golf is mostly popular among the older demographic, with more members over the age of 24 than any other sport in Denmark.

In pro golf, Thomas Bjørn has dominated the Danish scene for many years, along with Anders Hansen, Søren Hansen and Steen Tinning on the European Tour. On the Ladies European Tour, Iben Tinning is the most successful Danish player.

American Football
American football is a minor sport in Denmark with Well under 1.000 players. The governing body the Danish American Football Federation was formed in 1988. The top level league is the National Ligaen. The final game for the national championship is called the Mermaid Bowl and the first was played in 1988. The national teams both youth and senior level has competed in the European Championship of American football.

Basketball

Denmark's national team had a few strong showings at senior and youth level. The Bakken Bears currently hold the attendance record for a single basketball game in Denmark.

Boxing
Denmark has many great boxers, including former Super Middleweight World Boxing Council World Champion and Super Middleweight World Boxing Association (WBA) World Champion, Mikkel Kessler. Former great boxers include Johnny Bredahl a former WBO and WBA champion and Brian Nielsen who fought Mike Tyson in 2001. The active boxer Ahmed Khaddour who was in the American reality TV show The Contender also comes from Denmark. Other boxers that have won titles at an international level are Patrick Nielsen and his brother Micki Nielsen.

Cricket
Cricket has a little presence in Denmark. But the Denmark national cricket team has been performing well in Europe. Cricket has been played in Denmark since the mid 19th century, brought there by the British. As well as the men's team, the Denmark national women's cricket team has also played international matches.

Flag football
The Danish flag football team, is one of the best Flag football teams in the world, having won a record 6 consecutive EFAF European Flag Football Championship and 2 bronze medals. They also won 4 silver medals at the IFAF Flag Football World Championship and 2 bronze medals. The women's team also had success, as they won the european championship in 2017 hosted in Denmark.

Mixed martial arts
Denmark has various Mixed Martial Arts fighters with the most prominent being Martin Kampmann. Kampmann fought for the Ultimate Fighting Championship (UFC) as a 170-pound welterweight and was considered one of the best fighters in the division. Other Danish fighters that have competed in the UFC include Anna Elmose, Nicolas Dalby, Joachim Christensen, Christian Colombo, and Mads Burnell.

Motor sports
In Denmark, there is also a small but successful group of people doing motorsport. The driver with the most 24 Hours of Le Mans wins so far is Denmark's Tom Kristensen with nine first places. Jan Magnussen has been a Corvette Racing factory driver since 2004, having claimed several GT class wins at the 24 Hours of Le Mans, 24 Hours of Daytona, 12 Hours of Sebring and Petit Le Mans. His son Kevin Magnussen has been competing in Formula One since 2014. Other notable Danish drivers include Kurt Thiim, Nicki Thiim, Jason Watt, Michael Christensen and Marco Sørensen.

The main permanent racetracks are Ring Djursland, Jyllands-Ringen and Padborg Park. The Danish Touringcar Championship was held from 1999 to 2010, and the Danish Thundersport Championship has been held since 2012. In addition, the Copenhagen Historic Grand Prix has been held since 2001.

Physical education and gymnastics
Franz Nachtegall was influential in the introduction of physical education and gymnastics into schools of Denmark.

Racketlon
Denmark has the highest ranked racketlon player and two more within top seven (July 2015).

Rugby league football

Rugby league football is played at a local, national and international level. Currently the country is ranked 26th on the RLIF. Danish domestic teams, including Jutland RLFC (Jylland) and Copenhagen RLFC compete with teams from other areas of Southern Scandinavia.

Rugby union

The Danish Rugby Union dates back to 1950, and joined the IRB in 1988. There are about 3,000 registered players.

Tennis

Caroline Wozniacki is commonly referred to as the best Danish female tennis player in history. She is a former World No. 1 on the WTA Tour. As of 1 March 2017, she held this position for 71 weeks. She was the first Scandinavian woman to hold the top ranking position and 20th overall. She has won The Australian Open 2018 and 27 WTA singles titles incl 2017 WTA Finals  (and made 52 finals) as of March 2018, and is currently ranked number 2 in the WTA rankings.

Frederik Løchte Nielsen became the first Dane ever to win a Wimbledon championship title in 2012. Nielsen and his partner Marray, who had only played three tournaments together previously, also became the first wild card ever to win the Wimbledon men's doubles. His current position in the ATP doubles rankings is No. 249.

Notes

References

External links
DIF - The National Olympic Committee and Sports Confederation of Denmark